Kulturfabrik Esch-sur-Alzette (KuFa) is a cultural centre located in a former slaughterhouse in the city of Esch-sur-Alzette in Luxembourg. As of 2019, the state-funded centre attracts almost 80,000 visitors a year.

History 

From the 1880s until 1979, the complex of buildings served as the public slaughterhouse house of the city of Esch-sur-Alzette. Then in 1982 the buildings were squatted by the Theater GmbH, which used the spaces for rehearsals and performances. In 1983, this was formalised by the creation of a non-profit organisation. 
The Kulturfabrik became a cultural centre with state support in 1996. It received a renovation grant of 1.93 million euros and in 2002 was receiving 308,000 euros yearly to cover running costs. The Kulturfabrik opened officially in 1998.

Activities 

The Kulturfabrik is used as a cultural centre for artist residencies and as a platform for sustainable development.
As of 2019, the centre attracts almost 80,000 visitors yearly. There are 21 employees on permanent contracts and 6 on fixed term contracts.

The music venue has a capacity of 900 people. The centre also has a cinema, a café and a restaurant.

References

External links 
 Official website

Buildings and structures in Esch-sur-Alzette
Former squats
Squats
1998 establishments in Luxembourg
Social centres